Seattle Surge is a professional Call of Duty League (CDL) team located in Seattle, Washington. Representing the Luminosity Gaming esports organization, the Surge are owned and operated by Enthusiast Gaming and Canucks Sports & Entertainment.

History

Early years (2020–present) 
Following the establishment of the Surge in 2019, Seattle entered the CDL to start the 2020 season. The team's first starting roster was Karma, Octane, Apathy, Enable, and Slacked who were all coached by Joey "Nubzy" DiGiacomo.

Throughout the first two Call of Duty titles the Surge competed in (Modern Warfare and Black Ops: Cold War), the team did not score well in 2020 league matches and finished in last place in the 2020 Call of Duty League Championship. The team underwent multiple roster changes and shifts in the 2020 and 2021 seasons, including the acquisition of players Pandur and Proto in 2020 and a drastic roster change in 2021. The team then consisted of Octane, Classic, Gunless, Prestinni, and Loony. Decemate also made an appearance on the squad, but only for a short time, being released from the Surge just 15 days after signing. Despite these changes, Seattle tallied another disappointing season in 2021 league matches. This led to the release of its entire roster, including the Head Coaching position.

In September 2021, the organization announced the acquisition of veteran Accuracy along with Sib, Pred, and Mack. They also named Sam "Fenix" Spencer as the new head coach and Brandon "Novus" Hewitt as the new general manager.

In the league's first official LAN tournament of the new COD year and title, Call of Duty: Vanguard, the Seattle Surge took 2nd place in the 2022 Kickoff Classic, losing 3–1 map count in the Grand Finals to the Toronto Ultra. They won a match against the 2021 COD World Champions Atlanta FaZe, and also defeated an experienced NYSL team. Seattle Surge went on to defeat the Atlanta Faze in the CDL 2022 Major 3 Grand Final to secure the franchise's first tournament win ever.

The 2022 Season Pred got Rookie of the year. He was also part of the all star team (1st Team) which Sib was on the opposing all star team (2nd Team).

Roster

References

External links
 

Venture capital-funded esports teams
Esports teams based in the United States
Call of Duty League teams
Esports teams established in 2019